The men's 1500 metres at the 1950 European Athletics Championships was held in Brussels, Belgium, at Heysel Stadium on 24 and 27 August 1950.

Medalists

Results

Final
27 August

Heats
24 August

Heat 1

Heat 2

Heat 3

Participation
According to an unofficial count, 20 athletes from 13 countries participated in the event.

 (1)
 (2)
 (1)
 (1)
 (2)
 (1)
 (1)
 (1)
 (3)
 (2)
 (1)
 (2)
 (2)

References

1500 metres
1500 metres at the European Athletics Championships